Fredrik Andersson may refer to:

 Fredrik Andersson (ice hockey) (born 1968), Swedish ice hockey goaltender
 Fredrik Andersson (footballer, born 1988), Swedish footballer
 Fredrik Andersson (footballer, born 1971), Swedish footballer

See also 
 Frederick Anderson (disambiguation)